is a Japanese former football goalkeeper.

Career
Ozawa was born in Namegata on March 17, 1974.

Kashima Antlers
After graduating from high school, he joined Kashima Antlers in 1992. He could hardly play in the match behind Masaaki Furukawa and Yohei Sato. In July 1997, he left the club for spinal disc herniation.

Yokohama Marinos
In October 1998, he joined Yokohama Marinos (later Yokohama F. Marinos). However he could hardly play in the match behind Yoshikatsu Kawaguchi.

Cerezo Osaka (loan)
In 2000, he also played for Cerezo Osaka on loan from March to August.

Tokyo
In 2001, he moved to FC Tokyo. However he could hardly play in the match behind Yoichi Doi.

Kashima Antlers
In 2004, he returned to Antlers for the first time in 7 years. Although he could hardly play in the match behind Hitoshi Sogahata, he played 12 matches in 2006 because Sogahata got hurt.

Sportivo Luqueño
In January 2010, Sportivo Luqueño's president confirmed Ozawa's signing for the 2010 season, and was confirmed that the club's contact made with foreigners was done through Jose Luis Chilavert. When incorporating into the team, Ozawa joined goalkeepers Mario Villasanti and Arístides Florentín. He also joined Cameroon footballer Georges Nouga, Brazilians Eliel Cruz and Emerson Reba, Argentines Federico Cataruozzolo, Héctor Olmedo, Jonathan Germano, Alfredo Cano and Ruben Cecco, Chilean Claudio Chavarria and Colombian Carlos Valencia in the team. On 11 November 2010, Ozawa debuted for Sportivo Luqueño in a 1–1 away draw against Olimpia Asunción, goalkeeping for 90 minutes. On 21 November 2010, Ozawa goalkeeped for a full game in a 3–1 home victory against Tacuary. On 28 November 2010, Ozawa goalkeeped the entire game in a 0–0 away draw against Sport Colombia
 On 5 December 2010, Ozawa appeared in his last game for Sportivo Luqueño in a 1–1 home draw against Sol de América. The games disputed were for the 2010 Torneo Clausura.

Albirex Niigata
In 2011, he returned to Japan and signed with Albirex Niigata in April. From June, he played as regular goalkeeper until end of the season instead Masaaki Higashiguchi who got hurt. He retired end of 2012 season.

Club statistics

References

External links
 Hideaki Ozawa at playmakerstats.com
 
 The Players Agent Profile
 
 
 

1974 births
Living people
Association football people from Ibaraki Prefecture
Japanese footballers
J1 League players
Paraguayan Primera División players
Kashima Antlers players
Yokohama F. Marinos players
Cerezo Osaka players
FC Tokyo players
Sportivo Luqueño players
Albirex Niigata players
Japanese expatriate footballers
Japanese expatriate sportspeople in Paraguay
Expatriate footballers in Paraguay
Association football goalkeepers